Jimmy Thordsen (born 23 July 1948) is a former Puerto Rican basketball player who competed in the 1972 Summer Olympics and in the 1976 Summer Olympics.

References

1948 births
Living people
Basketball players at the 1972 Summer Olympics
Basketball players at the 1975 Pan American Games
Basketball players at the 1976 Summer Olympics
Olympic basketball players of Puerto Rico
Pan American Games silver medalists for Puerto Rico
Puerto Rican men's basketball players
1974 FIBA World Championship players
Saint Joseph's Pumas men's basketball players
Pan American Games medalists in basketball
Medalists at the 1975 Pan American Games